Sea Bee ( or ), later known as Ernest Borel, was a Hong Kong football club which competed for many years in the Hong Kong First Division. In 1993, the parent company of the club, Ernest Borel, loaned the right to compete in the First Division to another company, and the team competed as Voicelink during the 1993–94 season.

Sea Bee won their only major trophies in 1991–92 by winning the Viceroy Cup and the Hong Kong FA Cup under the name Ernest Borel.

Honours
 Hong Kong FA Cup
 Champions (1): 1991–92
 Runners-up (3): 1980–81, 1981–82, 1992–93
 Viceroy Cup
 Champions (1): 1991–92

See also
 Ernest Borel

References
  

 
Defunct football clubs in Hong Kong
1994 disestablishments in Hong Kong